Levys Judith Torres (born April 6, 1978) is a former Colombian female professional basketball player.

She competed at the 2011 Pan American Games as a member of the Colombia women's national basketball team.

References

External links 
 Profile at LatinBasket.com

1978 births
Living people
Basketball players at the 2011 Pan American Games
Centers (basketball)
Chipola Indians women's basketball players
Colombian expatriate basketball people in the United States
Colombian women's basketball players
Florida State Seminoles women's basketball players
Miami Sol players
Pan American Games competitors for Colombia
Sportspeople from Barranquilla